René Desaeyere (born 14 September 1947) is a Belgian former football player and former manager of Muangthong United.

Career 

Desaeyere played for Beerschot, Daring Club Bruxelles, Royal Antwerp, R.W.D. Molenbeek, Berchem Sport and Dessel Sport.

Coaching career 

He managed Dessel Sport, Berchem Sport, Standard de Liège, Beveren, Genk, Germinal Ekeren, Kortrijk, Zwarte Leeuw Rijkevorsel, Beerschot, Cheonan Ilhwa Chunma (Currently Seongnam FC), Cerezo Osaka, FC Denderleeuw, Royal Antwerp, Turnhout and Muangthong United.

Managerial statistics

References

External links 
 Profile

1947 births
Living people
Belgian footballers
K. Beerschot V.A.C. players
Royal Antwerp F.C. players
R.W.D. Molenbeek players
K. Berchem Sport players
Belgian football managers
K. Berchem Sport managers
Standard Liège managers
K.S.K. Beveren managers
K.R.C. Genk managers
K.V. Kortrijk managers
Seongnam FC managers
Royal Antwerp F.C. managers
J1 League managers
Cerezo Osaka managers
K.F.C. Dessel Sport players
Expatriate football managers in Japan
Expatriate football managers in South Korea
Rene Desaeyere
K.V. Turnhout managers
Association football defenders
Belgian expatriate sportspeople in Myanmar
Belgian expatriate sportspeople in Japan
Belgian expatriate sportspeople in South Korea
Belgian expatriate sportspeople in Thailand
Expatriate football managers in Thailand
Expatriate football managers in Myanmar
Footballers from Antwerp